Palamida  is a commercial software company based in San Francisco, California. Palamida makes software targeted at organizations concerned with managing both intellectual property and vulnerability issues associated with the use of open source and other third party software. Gartner Group refers to the category as Software Composition Analysis.

Products 

Palamida Enterprise Edition 6.0, which identifies complete or partial matches between a target software project, and known open source and other third party software, as well as provides a management system for inventory, policies, vulnerability alerts, action items, and approval process workflow.

History 

Palamida was founded in 2003, with venture financing of $5 million from Hummer Winblad Venture Partners. Founders Jeff Luszcz, Theresa Bui-Friday, and Ray Waldin had previously worked together at Cacheon, Inc. The team had experienced a situation in which open-source software was used within the product’s kernel, which required remediation in order to comply with a potential acquirer’s policy for use of open source. That experience culminated in the founding of Palamida Software. Mark Tolliver, formerly Executive Vice President of Marketing and Strategy at Sun Microsystems, joined Palamida in May 2005 as President and CEO.

Palamida launched its first software product, the Palamida IP Amplifier, in February 2005 at the LinuxWorld Conference and Expo in Boston. IP Amplifier differed from existing products offered by targeting the software developer. The IP Amplifier suite was intended to run on the developer’s system, in parallel with the software being developed. IP Amplifier was followed by a set of products: Palamida Enterprise Edition, Palamida Standard Edition, and Palamida Compliance Edition, differing in feature sets and functionality.

Palamida was among the early organizers of best practices for utilizing open source software within companies, launching its website, IPIngredients.org and a GPL3 adoption website in 2006.

Palamida maintains a large database of open source projects and licenses.

In addition to a software application, Palamida offers consulting services. These include code reviews and audits for mergers and acquisitions, and baseline audits for existing software products as part of the compliance process within software development organizations. Palamida’s consulting group also offers training and support services to new and existing clients.

Flexera Software acquired Palamida on October 27, 2016.

References

External links

 Company homepage: palamida.com

Privately held companies based in California
Companies based in San Francisco
Software companies based in the San Francisco Bay Area
Companies established in 2003
2003 establishments in California
Defunct software companies of the United States